John Y. Gotanda is an American attorney and academic administrator who has worked as the president of Hawaii Pacific University since July 1, 2016.

Early life and education 
Gotanda was born and raised in Hawaii, and earned his Bachelor of Business Administration from University of Hawaii at Manoa in 1984. He earned his Juris Doctor from the William S. Richardson School of Law in 1987.

Career 
After graduating from law school, Gotanda served as a staff attorney with the United States Court of Appeals for the District of Columbia Circuit. He then joined Covington & Burling in Washington, D.C. an associate attorney and later joined Goodwin Procter in Boston. In 1994, Gotanda joined the faculty of Villanova University as a law professor, where he later served as Associate Dean for Academic Affairs, Associate Dean for Faculty Research, Director of the J.D./M.B.A. Program, and Dean of the Villanova University School of Law from 2011 to 2016, and became President of Hawai‘i Pacific University, the largest private university in the State of Hawai‘i on July 1, 2016.

References

Living people
Year of birth missing (living people)

American lawyers
Hawaii Pacific University people

University of Hawaiʻi at Mānoa alumni
Villanova University faculty